The 2016 Spanish Quidditch Cup was the first edition of this tournament. It was played on the February 6th and 7th, 2016 in Campo Grande football fields in Rivas-Vaciamadrid, Madrid. 8 teams from Andalusia, Basque Country, Galicia and Madrid joined for this event where the locals, Madrid Wolves, won the championship beating Bizkaia Boggarts in the final 140-70*.

Team

Sistema de competición 

The teams were divided into two groups seeding by their position in Asociación Quidditch España's regional tournaments. It was tried to avoid that teams from the same region were assigned to the same group. In each group teams would play against each other to qualify to semifinals. First and second from each group would qualify.

They were ranked by:

 Won games.
 Quaffle Point Difference (QPD, capped to 150 points).
 Number of Snith When It Matters (SWIM).
 Quaffle points scored.
 Caught snitches.
 Fewer red cards.
 Fewer yellow cards.
 Fewer blue cards.
 Fastest snitch catch.
 Fastest first goal.

In the knockout phase, the first of group A will play against the second in group B and the first in group B against the second in group A. Winners went to the final and losers to the consolation match.

Champion and runner-up qualified to European Quidditch Cup 2016.

Pool play

Pool A

Pool B

Knockouts

Final ranking

Statistics 

Complete stats

Top scorers

Bookings

Records

Individual 

 More goals in a game: 9 - Tono (Malaka Vikings) (Malaka Vikings 170*-40 Gasteiz Gamusins)
 Fastest goal: 7" - Artur Martin (Madrid Wolves) (Madrid Wolves 140-70* Bizkaia Boggarts)

Team records 

 Biggest win: Madrid Wolves 210*-30 Gasteiz Gamusins
 Game with most goals: Dementores 150*-100 Madrid Lynx
 More snitches captures: 4 - Bizkaia Boggarts & Madrid Wolves
 Games without receiving goal: -
 Games without scoring: -
 Most bookings: 4 blue, 4 yellow, 1 red - Pontevedra Q.C.

References 

 Diario Sport - La primera Copa de España de quidditch se disputará en febrero en Rivas-Vaciamadrid
 SportYou - Madrid acogerá la primera Copa de España de Quidditch
 Onda Cero Coslada - Preparación de la primera copa de España
 Madridiario - El deporte de Harry Potter llega a Rivas
 El Ibérico - Primera copa de España de Quidditch muggle
 Cadena COPE - Entrevista a Rion Blake y Andrés Vargas

Quidditch competitions
Sport in Spain